IUCAB (Internationally United Commercial Agents and Brokers) is the worldwide alliance of independent sales organisations. It was founded in 1953 in Amsterdam and is currently based in Vienna, Austria. The alliance represents the interests of the member associations as well as their members at an international level.

Today's membership of IUCAB consists of 20 national associations throughout th EU, North America, Asia and Africa representing approximately 600,000 commercial agencies and independent sales companies. The agencies generate for their principals a turnover of EUR 999 billions.
Therefore they are an important partner to place the products in the market and to boost the economy.

Through the leading international B2B platform for trade and distribution, IUCAB supports principals (manufacturers/suppliers) around the globe to develop and expand their sales through arranging representations.

IUCAB. We speak the international language of sales.

References
 IUCAB President and Executive Committee 
 Members worldwide

External links
Internationally United Commercial Agents and Brokers
IUCAB B2B Platform

Organizations established in 1953
1953 establishments in Austria
Companies based in Vienna